Rotimi Peters is a retired Nigerian athlete who competed in the 400 & 4x400 meters.

He competed for Nigeria in the 1984 Summer Olympics held in Los Angeles, United States in the 4 x 400 meters relay where he won the bronze medal with his teammates Sunday Uti, Moses Ugbusien and Innocent Egbunike.

External links
 Sports Reference

Nigerian male sprinters
Olympic bronze medalists for Nigeria
Athletes (track and field) at the 1984 Summer Olympics
Olympic athletes of Nigeria
Living people
Year of birth missing (living people)
Medalists at the 1984 Summer Olympics
Olympic bronze medalists in athletics (track and field)